Mikael Ericsson (born February 28, 1960) is a Swedish former rally driver. During his career he competed in 40 events in the World Rally Championship, including two victories consecutively in 1989, his best year, when he finished fourth overall.

WRC victories
{|class="wikitable"
!   #  
! Event
! Season
! Co-driver
! Car
|-
| 1
|  9º Rally Argentina
| 1989
| Claes Billstam
| Lancia Delta Integrale
|-
| 2
|  39th 1000 Lakes Rally
| 1989
| Claes Billstam
| Mitsubishi Galant VR-4
|}

WRC results

External links
Mikael Ericsson at Rallybase.nl
Mikael Ericsson at ewrc-results
Mikael Ericsson at Rallye-info.com

1960 births
Living people
Swedish rally drivers
World Rally Championship drivers
Toyota Gazoo Racing drivers
Audi Sport drivers
Nismo drivers